Werner Proft (born August 12, 1901, date of death unknown) was a German field hockey player who competed in the 1928 Summer Olympics.

He was a member of the German field hockey team, which won the bronze medal. He played three matches as back.

External links
 
profile

1901 births
Field hockey players at the 1928 Summer Olympics
German male field hockey players
Olympic bronze medalists for Germany
Olympic field hockey players of Germany
Year of death missing
Olympic medalists in field hockey
Medalists at the 1928 Summer Olympics